La Zanzara is an Italian radio program created by the Italian journalist, Giuseppe Cruciani, and broadcast on Radio 24. Journalist David Parenzo is the co-host. The show is known for giving space to controversial topics and for being politically incorrect. It is also famous for prank calls to Italian celebrities and politicians.

Awards 
 2008 – Grolla d'oro
 2011 – Premio Cuffia d'Oro.
 2012 – Premio Satira Politica
 2012 – Premio Cuffia d'Oro
 2013 – Premiolino
 2013 – Ambrogino d'oro
 2014 – Premio Cuffia d'Oro
 2015 – Premio Cuffia d'Oro

References

Italian radio programs